Stan Nicholls (born 1949) is a British author and journalist, working full-time since 1981. He is the author of many novels and short stories but is best known for the Orcs: First Blood series.

Career
His journalism has appeared in The Guardian, The Independent, The Daily Mirror, Time Out, Sight and Sound, Rolling Stone, SFX and Locus among many others. Nicholls has worked for a number of specialists and general book shops including Dark They Were, and Golden Eyed and was the first manager of the London branch of Forbidden Planet.

Following on from Weapons of Magical Destruction, Part Two in the Bad Blood series, Army of Shadows was released in October 2009. The final book in the trilogy, Bad Blood: Inferno, was released in December 2011. A graphic novel set in the Orcs universe was set for release in 2010 or 2011.

Awards
The first two books in the Orcs: First Blood series, Bodyguard of Lightning and Legion of Thunder, received best novel nominations at the 1999 British Fantasy Awards. In 2007, Nicholls was awarded the Le'Fantastique Lifetime Achievement Award for Contributions to Literature at the Trolls & Legendes Festival in Mons, Belgium. His 2008 novel Orcs Bad Blood 1: Weapons of Magical Destruction was nominated for the inaugural David Gemmell Legend Award for best fantasy novel.

Personal life
Nicholls currently lives in the West Midlands with his wife, science fiction author Anne Gay.

Bibliography
Orcs
 First Blood: Bodyguard of Lightning
 First Blood: Legion of Thunder
 First Blood: Warriors of Tempest
 Orcs: First Blood (omnibus edition of the First Blood trilogy)
 Bad Blood: Weapons of Magical Destruction (Titled "Orcs: Bad Blood" in America) 
 Bad Blood: Army of Shadows
 Bad Blood: Inferno
 Orcs Bad Blood: The Second Omnibus (omnibus edition of the Bad Blood trilogy)

Dreamtime Trilogy
 Quicksilver Rising / Covenant Rising
 Quicksilver Zenith / Righteous Blade
 Quicksilver Twilight / Diamond Isle

Nightshade Trilogy
 Book of Shadows
 Shadow of a Sorcerer
 Gathering of Shadows

References

External links
 
 
 Story Behind Orcs : Bad Blood Omnibus) - Online Essay at Upcoming4.me

1949 births
British fantasy writers
British non-fiction writers
British short story writers
Daily Mirror people
The Guardian journalists
The Independent people
Living people
British male writers
British male short story writers
Male non-fiction writers